Camberwell is a closed railway station in Camberwell, South London, England. It opened in 1862 but was closed to passengers in 1916 and closed to all traffic in 1964. The possibility of the station's re-opening has been raised in recent years.

Opening and closure 
Camberwell station was opened on 6 October 1862 by the London, Chatham and Dover Railway (LC&DR) as part of the company's ambitious "City Branch" from Herne Hill to Blackfriars. It was constructed on a viaduct with entry at street level. On 1 May 1863 the name was changed to Camberwell New Road. The station initially had two facing platforms, but was expanded to four lines with the addition of a central island lines with the additional lines opening on 1 January 1866. The signal box built at the northern end of the island in the late 1890s is Grade II listed.

In October 1908, following its 1899 change of management to the merged South Eastern and Chatham Railway, its name reverted to Camberwell. As with many other London stations during World War I, wartime restraints forced it to close to passenger traffic on 3 April 1916. Before the outbreak of war, the station had suffered dwindling passenger usage following the introduction of electric tram services in the area. It remained in use for goods traffic until 18 April 1964.

Modern use
Today, the original station building located on the west side of Camberwell Station Road is in converted use as a mechanic's garage. At track level, nothing of the two side platforms remain but small fragments of the degraded island platform are still visible. The goods yard is now occupied by a residential development.

Camberwell station was mentioned in the 1956 film Private's Progress as a good place to get off a train and avoid paying a fare. It was made to sound like a working station, despite the fact that it had closed nearly 40 years before the film was set.

Possible re-opening

In 2002, a study undertaken by a rail expert, Nick Alexander, concluded that a "station located at the old Camberwell station site should be considered if the option were to be considered in future".

In June 2014, Transport for London (TfL) commissioned Steer Davies Gleave to undertake a feasibility study to consider the possibility of re-opening Camberwell and Walworth railway stations on the line where trains run non-stop between Loughborough Junction or Denmark Hill and Elephant & Castle. The study concluded that a re-opened Camberwell station could cater for 8- or 12-car trains, but that complete reconstruction might be required. The cost of a 12-car station would be £27.5m (£20.7m cheaper than Walworth). 40% of the cost was the cost of rebuilding four bridges.

In December 2015, TfL announced that its proposed Bakerloo line extension would follow a route via the Old Kent Road to Lewisham, rather than through a new underground station in Camberwell and Peckham to the same destination. In March 2016, it was reported that Mayor of London Boris Johnson understood the Bakerloo line extension did not solve Camberwell's poor rail connectivity, adding that TfL were investigating the re-opening of Camberwell railway station in consultation with stakeholders, including the London Borough of Southwark and the London Borough of Lambeth, and that initial feasibility studies indicate it would be possible to construct a modern station on the site if timetables could be modified to accommodate Camberwell as an additional stop.

In June 2017, Steer Davies Gleave produced a TfL-commissioned report discussing the possibility of the station's re-opening in 2026 in three future land use densities across three levels of operational use (four 8-car trains per hour, six 8-car trains per hour and six 12-car trains per hour) to give a total of nine scenarios. It estimated the capital cost of an 8-car station at £36.74m and a 12-car station at £38.50m. Its transport user analysis concluded that no scenario produced a net benefit, because Camberwell station users' journey time benefit would be more than offset by those travelling into London from further afield. It also concluded the wider economic impact would be negative and that the increase to land value in the area would be modest. SDG's journey time benefit analysis was based on a Mott MacDonald report that reached similar conclusions, but that the journey time cost would be unlikely to be noticed by users, and that the overall impact of the opening of the station would be minimal.

The Labour Party included a promise to campaign for the station's re-opening in its manifesto ahead of the 2018 Southwark London Borough Council election held in May.

In September 2018, TfL published a strategic business case to explore the station's reinstatement. It acknowledged the area's poor transport connectivity and that the reopening of the National Rail station was the best of eight options examined. While it concluded the local area would benefit from the station's re-opening, its conclusions were similar to Steer Davies Gleave's 2017 report.

In July 2020, the station was included in a shortlist of stations under consideration for reopening as part of the third round of the New Stations Fund scheme, but ultimately was not successful.

See also
Bakerloo line extension to Camberwell

References

External links
 Blackfriars Bridge - Loughborough Junction

Disused railway stations in the London Borough of Southwark
Railway stations in Great Britain opened in 1862
Railway stations in Great Britain closed in 1916
Camberwell
Former London, Chatham and Dover Railway stations
1862 establishments in England